Collected Fantasies is a collection of fantasy short stories, written by Avram Davidson and edited by John Silbersack. It was first published in paperback by Berkley Books in June 1982.

Summary
The book collects twelve novelettes and short stories by the author, originally published in various magazines, with an introduction by the editor.

Contents
"Introduction" (John Silbersack)
"Sacheverell"
"Help! I Am Dr. Morris Goldpepper"
"Dragon Skin Drum"
"The Lord of Central Park"
"Or All the Seas with Oysters"
"The Man Who Saw the Elephant"
"Manatee Gal, Won't You Come Out Tonight"
"The Sources of the Nile"
"The Certificate"
"The Golem"
"The Cobblestones of Saratoga Street"
"Faed-Out"

Reception
The collection was reviewed by Debbie Notkin in Locus #259, August 1982, Len Hatfield in Science Fiction & Fantasy Book Review #7, September 1982, Thomas M. Disch in Rod Serling's The Twilight Zone Magazine, January-February 1983, and Nigel Richardson in Paperback Inferno v. 7, no. 1, August 1983.

Awards
The collection placed eleventh in the 1983 Locus Poll Award for Best SIngle Author Collection.

Notes

1982 short story collections
Short story collections by Avram Davidson
Fantasy short story collections
Berkley Books books